Vân Hồ is a rural district of Sơn La province in the Northwest region of Vietnam. As of 2003 the district had a population of 55,797. The district covers an area of 979.84 km². The district capital lies at Vân Hồ.

References

Districts of Sơn La province
Sơn La province